Frank Romano is an American born guitarist, songwriter and record producer, influenced by a number of musical styles and backgrounds.

Career 
Currently based in Nashville, Tennessee, Romano grew up in a musical family in the suburbs of Cleveland, Ohio, where he was the guitarist for the Cincinnati funk band, Freebass (now known as Freekbass), a group produced by Bootsy Collins.

Romano has toured and performed internationally with Rob Thomas, Mary J. Blige, Toni Braxton, and Kanye West, among others. He has appeared alongside many of these artists on numerous national television shows, performing on Jay Leno, the Late Show with David Letterman, The View, The Ellen DeGeneres Show, MTV, The Today Show, and Good Morning America. In 2005, he performed with Rob Thomas at the Live-8 Concert, in Philadelphia, Pennsylvania, and can also be seen on Rob Thomas's DVD, Live At Red Rocks, contributing in his backing band on guitar.

Aside from touring, Romano continues to work in the studio as a songwriter, producer and session guitarist.  He has worked on recordings with Justin Timberlake, Kanye West, Akon, Usher, and Rob Thomas, and has collaborated with some prominent music producers.

Romano is represented by the worldwide publishing company, Reach Music, and has signed a joint venture with Reach Music and BMG. He has been recognized with seven ASCAP songwriter awards for his work on the songs, “I Need a Girl” (Part 2)  by P. Diddy. “Don’t Change” by Musiq Soulchild, Usher's, "There Goes My Baby"  and two awards (2011 and 2012) for Nelly's hit, "Just A Dream".

Discography: single, DVD and studio album credits

Awards
2002 ASCAP Rhythm and Soul Award for work on: "Don't Change" by Musiq Soulchild 
2003 ASCAP Rhythm and Soul Award in the R&B/Hip-Hop Category for work on: "I Need A Girl (Part 2) by P. Diddy & Ginuwine feat. Loon, Mario Winans & Tami Ruggeri
2003 ASCAP Rhythm and Soul Award in the Rap Category for work on: "I Need A Girl (Part 2) by P. Diddy & Ginuwine feat. Loon, Mario Winans & Tami Ruggeri
2004 ASCAP Pop Music Award for work on: "I Need A Girl (Part 2) by P. Diddy & Ginuwine feat. Loon, Mario Winans & Tami Ruggeri
2010 ASCAP Rhythm and Soul Award in the R&B/Hip-Hop Category for work on: "There Goes My Baby" by Usher
2011 ASCAP Pop Music Award for work on: "Just A Dream" by Nelly
2012 ASCAP Pop Music Award for work on: "Just A Dream" by Nelly

References

1970 births
Living people
American funk guitarists
American rock guitarists
American soul guitarists
American male guitarists
American session musicians
Songwriters from Ohio
Record producers from Ohio
Guitarists from Ohio
21st-century American guitarists
21st-century American male musicians
American male songwriters